Telemiracle is an annual telethon organized by the Kinsmen and Kinettes in Saskatchewan, Canada for the benefit of the Kinsmen Foundation. Initially broadcast on both CTV and CBC affiliates in Saskatchewan, it is now broadcast, commercial-free, exclusively on the province's CTV affiliates–CKCK in Regina, CFQC in Saskatoon, CIPA in Prince Albert and CICC in Yorkton.

The telethon is generally broadcast the first full weekend of March, but in a rare and COVID-19-induced exception to that rule, the 45th edition of the telethon was based at Prairieland Park in Saskatoon on February 27 and 28, 2021.  Like the 2021 telethon, the 46th edition of the telethon took place without a live audience, in Regina's International Trade Centret on March 5 and 6, 2022.  Telemiracle 47 returned to Saskatoon's Prairieland Park on February 25 and 26, 2023.

History

Originally, the Kinsmen had the idea to have a car raffle to raise funds to help with all the requests for assistance they received but the government wouldn't allow it.  So instead, they came up with the idea for a telethon. In 1977, the first telethon raised more than CAD $1 million, which at the time was considered a record for per capita telethon fund-raising in a 20-hour period (the province had a population of less than 1 million people at the time). The telethon passed the $2 million mark for the first time in 1983, and the $3 million mark in 2001.  Telemiracle has exceeded the $4 million mark fourteen times and $5 million eleven times, most recently in 2022. Telemiracle exceeded the $7 million mark for the first time on March 4, 2018, and the $8 million mark for the first time on March 6, 2022.

Early broadcasts of the telethon featured a mix of national and international celebrities such as John Allan Cameron, Gloria Loring, Alan Thicke, the Irish Rovers, Arte Johnson of Laugh-In, Bob McGrath of Sesame Street, game show personality Jim Perry, his daughter Erin Perry, singer and TV host Blake Emmons (who was the telethon's de facto host during the first few years, a post later taken over by Thicke in the 1980s and most recently by Beverley Mahood and Brad Johner), pianist Frank Mills and Saskatchewan-born motivational speaker Alvin Law. In recent years, the event has mostly attracted Canadian talent. Traditionally, the telethon alternates between the two major Saskatchewan cities of Saskatoon and Regina.

Bob McGrath, a regular fixture on Telemiracle for 38 years, was awarded the Commemorative Medal for the Centennial of Saskatchewan for this work by the Lieutenant Governor of Saskatchewan, Lynda Haverstock, on March 3, 2006. He announced during the 2015 telethon that it would be his last, but returned for the final four hours of the 2018 telethon.

Telemiracle 31 (2007), the first telethon to exceed the $5,000,000 pledge total, broke all previous records, with an official final total of $5,604,682. This record was broken in 2012 (Telemiracle 36) with a final total of $5,906,229. This record was once again broken on March 4, 2018 (Telemiracle 42) with a final total of $7,151,256. One bequest of over $1.2 million and one bequest of over $1.5 million contributed to the 2018 total. The current record is held by the 46th Telemiracle (2022); the  total of $8,002,722 included a bequest of $1,779,771.20, the largest pledge—bequest or otherwise—in the telethon's history.

A scheduling mixup resulted in Telemiracle 32 being relocated to Saskatoon in 2008. A convention was booked in Regina for the days leading up to the telethon, meaning that the usual setup time was not available.  Telemiracle was held in Saskatoon for 3 consecutive years. The telethon returned to Regina in 2010.

Format

Shown annually on CTV affiliates, the broadcast starts at 9 pm local time on the first Saturday in March (though for the first half of its history, it was often scheduled in February). The broadcast goes live to the host auditorium, where members of the national cast are introduced.

The previous theme was Mike + The Mechanics' 1986 hit "All I Need is a Miracle." it was replaced in 2011 with "You are the Miracle" by Brad Johner and Donny Parenteau.

The broadcast takes its only break at 11pm local time to allow for the CTV affiliates to broadcast the CTV National News (anchors from which have appeared on the telethon itself, most notably Lloyd Robertson and Harvey Kirck in the late 1970s). The telethon (and live broadcast) continues during this 30 minute news break and at 11:30pm stations that aired the newscast once again rejoin the broadcast until the conclusion of the show on Sunday evening at 5pm Central Standard Time. The broadcast always concludes with "O Canada" and a balloon and confetti drop during which time some of the volunteers take to the stage to celebrate; up through 2010, a rendition of "With a Little Help from My Friends" was included with the closing festivities.

For the first time in 2009, the show went to other various locations in Saskatchewan outside of Saskatoon or Regina.  It went to many of the smaller towns and cities across the province showcasing what the local residents have done to raise money.  The practice continued in 2010 and, for COVID-induced reasons, again in 2021.

Telemiracle was streamed online on CTV's website for the first time in 2010.

While the show is now carried only on Saskatchewan CTV stations, the production crew is composed of approximately 200 volunteers representing several broadcast networks, many traveling from outside of the province.

In 2018 a pre-show called the Countdown Show was added. It starts at 6:30 pm local time and runs till approximately 8:45 pm. It is streamed live to Telemiracle's YouTube channel, from the lobby of the host auditorium. The Countdown Show is hosted by two members of the national cast and features 12 Saskatchewan Talent performances.

Since 2021, Telemiracle has held in a modified format due to the COVID-19 pandemic, with no live audience and primarily pre-recorded performances. The production has also been held also held in a studio at Prairieland Park or International Trade Centre, rather than at TCU Place or Conexus Arts Centre as has been customary. A limited live audience of invited guests was reintroduced for 2023.

Annual totals
Telemiracle's website doesn't display the annual totals and they don't set annual goals, but their FAQ notes that the telethon raised over $111 million  through Telemiracle 39 in 2015, an amount that includes the $5,604,682 raised by Telemiracle 31 in 2007 and $5,906,229 at Telemiracle 36 in 2012.

At the 37th Telemiracle in 2013, the Kinsmen and Kinettes were proud to announce that the lifetime total for Telemiracle had surpassed 100 million dollars. Telemiracle has an all-time total raised of $159,315,346.

At the 42nd Telemiracle in 2018, a brand new record total was raised, thanks in large part to two individual bequeaths of over $1 million each. When the final tally was totalled up at 5:00 pm, a then-record of $7,151,256 was established. The 46th Telemiracle (2022) raised a total of $8,002,722.

Notable guests

National and international
Susan Aglukark - Canadian country music, folk, pop, and Aboriginal artist
The Arrogant Worms - Canadian band
Victoria Banks - Canadian country singer-songwriter and musician
Barra MacNeils - Celtic and folk band from the Maritimes
Jaydee Bixby - Runner up on season five of Canadian Idol
Tracey Brown - country music singer/songwriter (Family Brown, Prescott Brown fame)
Tal Bachman - Canadian rock singer and songwriter. Son of Randy Bachman
Billy Barty (1924 – 2000) - "B-Movie" legend, stage and film actor (a Telemiracle regular up to the time of his death)
Paul Brandt - Canadian singer-songwriter
Lisa Brokop - Canadian Country music singer-songwriter
Jim Byrnes - blues musician and actor
John Allan Cameron (1938 – 2006) - Canadian folk singer
George Canyon - Canadian country singer-songwriter and musician
Lorne Cardinal - Actor, best known for his role on Corner Gas
Rita Chiarelli - Blues singer-songwriter and musician
Burton Cummings - Singer-songwriter, musician, and former band member of The Guess Who
Bobby Curtola (1943 - 2016) - Canadian rock and roll singer
Leah Daniels - Canadian country singer
Melanie Doane - Fiddle player, singer-songwriter
Doc Walker - Canadian country band
Blake Emmons - Singer and TV host
Farmer's Daughter - Canadian country music trio
Sue Foley - Blues singer-songwriter and guitarist
George Fox - Canadian country music singer-songwriter and musician
Lance Frazier - Professional football player
Lawrence Gowan - Canadian singer
Adam Gregory - Canadian country singer-songwriter and musician
Liz Grogan - Canadian television hostess
Harlequin - Canadian rock band
Rolf Harris - comedian, singer/songwriter ("Jake the Peg," "Tie Me Kangaroo Down Sport" fame)
Jeff Healey (1966 - 2008) - Canadian jazz, rock, blues, and hard rock singer-songwriter and musician
Headpins - Canadian rock band
The Heartbroken - Canadian country music band
The Higgins - Canadian country, rock, and pop band
High Valley - Canadian country and Christian band
Justin Hines - Canadian pop singer
Honeymoon Suite - Canadian rock/pop rock band
Irish Rovers - Celtic and folk group
Carly Rae Jepsen - Canadian singer-songwriter and 2007 Canadian Idol finalist
Arte Johnson (1929 - 2019) - Laugh-In cast member
Marc Jordan - Canadian singer-songwriter
Michael Kaeshammer - Canadian boogie-woogie pianist, vocalist, composer, and arranger
Joan Kennedy - Canadian country music singer
Harvey Kirck (1928-2002) - CTV National News anchor
Richard Kline - Actor (Three's Company)
Lace - Canadian country music group
Nicolette Larson (1952-1997) - American singer 
Shari Lewis (1933 - 1998) - ventriloquist, children's entertainer
Gloria Loring - Singer, actress
Ashley MacIsaac - East coast singer, songwriter, fiddler
Rita MacNeil (1944 - 2013) - Canadian country music, Celtic, and folk singer
Beverley Mahood - Canadian country singer and CMT Canada personality
Charlie Major - Canadian country music singer-songwriter and musician
John McDermott - Canadian singer, songwriter, multi-instrumentalist
Bob McGrath (1932 - 2022) - Sesame Street cast member who took part in 38 Telemiracles; announced his retirement from the series in 2015
Jason McCoy - Canadian singer-songwriter and musician
Frank Mills - Pianist
Alannah Myles - Canadian singer-songwriter
Sierra Noble - Canadian fiddler, singer-songwriter, and multi-instrumentalist
One More Girl - Canadian country duo
Stella Parton - sister to Dolly Parton, country singer/songwriter
The Northern Pikes - Canadian rock band
Fred Penner - Singer, songwriter, musician, and children's entertainer
Jim Perry (1933 - 2015) - former game show host
Prescott-Brown - Canadian country music trio
Ronnie Prophet (1937 - 2018) - Canadian country music singer-songwriter and musician
Jimmy Rankin - Canadian country, folk singer-songwriter, and musician
Matt Rapley - Canadian R&B and gospel singer-songwriter and musician and 2008 Canadian Idol finalist
Johnny Reid - Country musician and singer-songwriter
Lloyd Robertson - CTV National News anchor
Stephen Schnetzer - Soap actor  Another World
Amy Sky - Canadian singer-songwriter
The Stampeders - Canadian rock trio
Glen Suitor - TSN sportscaster and former Saskatchewan Roughrider
Alan Thicke (1947 - 2016) - Actor and game show host
Shari Ulrich - Canadian singer-songwriter
Valdy - folk singer-songwriter
The Wilkinsons - Canadian country music group
Jim Witter - Singer-songwriter and musician
Tom Wopat - Actor and singer
Michelle Wright - Canadian country singer

Saskatchewan
Sheldon Bergstrom - Singer and actor
Brent Butt - Stand-up comedian, actor, creator of Corner Gas, grew up in Tisdale
Kim Coates - Saskatoon born actor
Darren Dutchyshen - Canadian sportscaster, co-hosts the evening edition of SportsCentre on TSN
Tom Jackson - Aboriginal singer, musician, and actor
Colin James - Regina-born Canadian blues legend
Brad Johner - Country singer-songwriter and musician
Connie Kaldor - Singer-songwriter, musician, and children' author
Chad Klinger - country music artist, grew up in Lashburn
Melanie Laine - Saskatchewan country music artist
Alvin Law - motivational speaker
Tyler Lewis - 2006 Canadian Idol finalist
Jess Moskaluke - Country music artist, grew up in Langenburg
Andrea Menard - Actor, singer-songwriter, playwright
Donny Parenteau - Singer-songwriter, musician, and multi-instrumentalist
Kyle Riabko - Saskatoon guitarist and singer-songwriter
Theresa Sokyrka - 2004 Canadian Idol runner up
Streetheart - Canadian rock band
Streetnix - A cappella group
Pamela Wallin - Television personality and diplomat

See also
Kin Canada
Hal Rogers

References

External links

Foundations based in Canada
Kin Canada
Canadian telethons
1977 Canadian television series debuts
CTV Television Network original programming